The Van Hall Instituut is part of the (vocational) University of Professional Education Van Hall Larenstein, and is specialised in agriculture, food technology, and environmental and animal sciences. It is a teaching, training, and research centre in the north of the Netherlands offering students Bachelor and Specialist degree programmes, which focus on such themes as nature, the environment, animal care, rural resources, sustainability, and nutrition.

The Van Hall Instituut is named after Herman van Hall (1801–74), a professor from the University of Groningen.

Also the Van Hall Instituut has got a sorority named S.V. Osiris, that is founded on the first of Januari, 1996. All students of all the different majors or bachelors can become a member of this sorority.

Locations
The Van Hall Instituut has two locations.
 Leeuwarden
 Groningen

Departments
 Environmental Science
 Food and Business
 Life Sciences
 Animal Management
 Agricultural Sciences
 Expertise Centre Geo-Information Studies and Soil Management

Collaborations
 Noordelijke Hogeschool Leeuwarden
 Stenden (formerly Christelijke Hogeschool Nederland)

External links
 Van Hall Instituut website
 Van Hall Larenstein website

Agricultural universities and colleges in the Netherlands
Wageningen University and Research
Educational institutions established in 1996
1996 establishments in the Netherlands
Organisations based in Friesland